The Apple Monitor II is a CRT-based green monochrome 12-inch monitor manufactured by Sanyo for Apple Computer; for the Apple II personal computer family. Apple did not introduce the monitor until halfway through the lifespan of the II series. The business-oriented Apple III had its own Apple Monitor III long before. Many home users of Apple II computers used their televisions as computer monitors before the Monitor II was released. It featured an inner vertical-swiveling frame. This allowed users to adjust the viewing angle up or down to suit their taste without the addition of a tilt-and-swivel device. The Monitor II was widely adjustable for the time, including adjustments for the size and location of the image on the screen.  These adjustments had a very small influence on the picture, however, much to the dislike of some users.  The Monitor II was designed for the Apple II+, but was used widely throughout the Apple II product line, most recognizably on the Apple IIe.

References

External links

Apple II peripherals
Apple Inc. displays